Hoxsey may refer to:

Hoxsey Therapy
Archibald Hoxsey (1884–1910), American aviator
Betty J. Hoxsey (1923-2011), American farmer and politician